Šutej is a surname. Notable people with the surname include:

 Miroslav Šutej (1936–2005), Croatian painter and graphic artist
 Tina Šutej (born 1988), Slovene pole vaulter
 Vjekoslav Šutej (1951–2009), Croatian orchestral conductor

See also
 

South Slavic-language surnames